Tartemat is a small agricultural town north of Béni Mellal in Béni Mellal Province, in the Béni Mellal-Khénifra region of Morocco.

References

Populated places in Béni Mellal Province